Westbrook  is a suburb of Rotorua in the Bay of Plenty Region of New Zealand's North Island.

Education

References

Suburbs of Rotorua
Populated places in the Bay of Plenty Region